The 2018 U.S. Classic, known as the 2018 GK U.S. Classic for sponsorship reasons, is the 35th edition of the U.S. Classic gymnastics tournament. The competition was held on July 28, 2018, at the Schottenstein Center in Columbus, Ohio.

Medalists

Participants

Seniors

 Shania Adams – Plain City, Ohio (Buckeye Gymnastics)
 Stephanie Berger – Groton, Massachusetts (Brestyan's)
 Simone Biles – Spring, Texas (World Champions Centre)
 Sloane Blakely – Frisco, Texas (WOGA)
 Luisa Blanco – Frisco, Texas (WOGA)
 Jade Carey – Phoenix, Arizona (Arizona Sunrays)
 Jordan Chiles – Vancouver, Washington (Naydenov Gymnastics)
 Audrey Davis – Frisco, Texas (WOGA)
 Olivia Dunne – Hillsdale, New Jersey (Eastern National Academy of Paramus)
 Kara Eaker – Grain Valley, Missouri (GAGE)
 Jaylene Gilstrap – McKinney, Texas (Metroplex Gymnastics)
 Olivia Hollingsworth – Seabrook, Texas (World Champions Centre)
 Morgan Hurd – Middletown, Delaware (First State Gymnastics)
 Madeleine Johnston – Boyds, Maryland (Hill's Gymnastics)
 Shilese Jones – Westerville, Ohio (Future Gymnastics)
 Adeline Kenlin – Iowa City, Iowa (IGN)
 Emily Lee – Los Gatos, California (West Valley Gymnastics)
 Isabel Mabanta – Frisco, Texas (Denton Gymnastics)
 Emma Malabuyo – Flower Mound, Texas (Texas Dreams Gymnastics)
 Grace McCallum – Isanti, Minnesota (Twin City Twisters)
 Riley McCusker – Brielle, New Jersey (MG Elite)
 Alyona Shchennikova – Evergreen, Colorado (5280 Gymnastics)
 Ragan Smith – Lewisville, Texas (Texas Dreams Gymnastics)
 Deanne Soza – Coppell, Texas (Texas Dreams Gymnastics)
 Madelyn Williams – Vacaville, California (San Mateo Gymnastics)

Juniors 

 Ciena Alipio – San Jose, California (West Valley Gymnastics)
 Sydney Barros – Woodstock, Georgia (Texas Dreams Gymnastics)
 Annie Beard – Dallas, Texas (Texas Dreams Gymnastics)
 Love Birt – Wyoming, Delaware (First State Gymnastics)
 Skye Blakely – Frisco, Texas (WOGA)
 Jordan Bowers – Lincoln, Nebraska (Solid Rock Gymnastics)
 Sophia Butler – Houston, Texas (Discover Gymnastics)
 Kailin Chio – Henderson, Nevada (Gymcats)
 Claire Dean – Oakland, California (Head Over Heels)
 Kayla DiCello – Boyds, Maryland (Hill's Gymnastics)
 Amari Drayton – Lakeway, Texas (Olympia Hills)
 Addison Fatta – Wrightsville, Pennsylvania (Prestige Gymnastics)
 Aleah Finnegan – Lee's Summit, Missouri (GAGE)
 Delaney Fisher – Flowery Branch, Georgia (Georgia Elite)
 eMjae Frazier – Erial, New Jersey (Parkettes)
 Gabbie Gallentine – Iron Station, North Carolina (Everest Gymnastics)
 Elizabeth Gantner – Indianapolis, Indiana (Jaycie Phelps Athletic Center)
 Karis German – Spring, Texas (World Champions Center)
 Trista Goodman – Henderson, Nevada (Salcianu Elite)
 Zoe Gravier – Holmdel, New Jersey (MG Elite)
 Olivia Greaves – Staten Island, New York (MG Elite)
 Hannah Hagle – Chireno, Texas (Texas East Gymnastics)
 Maeve Hahn – Lake Wylie, South Carolina (First in Flight)
 Selena Harris – Henderson, Nevada (Gymcats)
 Alexis Jeffrey – Warrensburg, Missouri (GAGE)
 Kaytlyn Johnson – Lantana, Texas (Denton Gymnastics Academy)
 Levi Jung-Ruivivar – Woodland Hills, California (Paramount Elite)
 Alonna Kratzer – Suwanee, Georgia (Top Notch Training Center)
 Sunisa Lee – St. Paul, Minnesota (Midwest Gymnastics)
 Lillian Lewis – Dublin, California (San Mateo Gymnastics)
 Kaliya Lincoln – Mountain House, California (Airborne Gymnastics)
 Lillian Lippeatt – Mason, Ohio (Cincinnati Gymnastics)
 Lauren Little – Mooresville, North Carolina (Everest Gymnastics)
 Mallory Marcheli – Richmond, Texas (Stars Gymnastics - Houston)
 Konnor McClain – Cross Lanes, West Virginia (Revolution Gymnastics)
 Sydney Morris – Bowie, Maryland (First State Gymnastics)
 Brenna Neault – Alta Loma, California (Precision Gymnastics)
 Lauren Pearl – Milford, Massachusetts (Brestyan's)
 Katelyn Rosen – Boerne, Texas (Mavericks at Artemovs)
 Lynden Saltness – Forest Lake, Minnesota (Midwest Gymnastics)
 Abigail Scanlon – Sterling, Virginia (Capital Gymnastics)
 JaFree Scott – Independence, Missouri (GAGE)
 Ava Siegfeldt – Hampton, Virginia (World Class Gymnastics)
 Victoria Smirnov – Hickory, North Carolina (Shooting Stars Gymnastics)
 Ui Soma – Belmont, California (San Mateo Gymnastics)
 Calvary Swaney – Gastonia, North Carolina (First in Flight)
 Tori Tatum – Chanhassen, Minnesota (Twin City Twisters))
 Leanne Wong – Overland Park, Kansas (GAGE)

References 

U.S. Classic
2018 in gymnastics
2018 in sports in Ohio